Diana Pinto is an Indian beauty pageant titleholder, who was crowned Miss India America 2009, at the 18th Annual Miss India America Pageant held at Long Beach, California on 7 August 2009.

Early life and family
Hailing from a Mangalorean Catholic family, Pinto was born and raised in Thane (near Mumbai). Her father Joseph Pinto hails from Urwa, Mangalore, and is a senior Manager in Bank of Baroda (Agra branch). Her mother Irene Pinto hails from Moodabidri (near Mangalore), and is also a Manager in Bank of Baroda (Mumbai branch). Both her parents have settled in Mumbai. She also has a younger brother, Brian Pinto. Pinto studied at the Holy Cross High School in Thane, and completed her Master's degree in Biokinesiology at the University of Southern California in Los Angeles, California in December 2007. She was also a district level volleyball player in India. She had won numerous awards in Sprints, Relay, Shot put, and Discus throw. Later, she worked in Los Angeles for a year, where she heard about the pageant and decided to apply. She moved to New York in 2009 to work as a Physical therapist .

Miss India America 2009
Having participated in Miss Asia USA pageant earlier, Pinto had decided to apply for the pageant. The event organizers had asked aspiring contestants to send applications and photographs in 2008. The only criteria were the contestant had to be of Indian origin and had to be less than 29 years of age. Pinto was directly short-listed for the semifinals after she sent her application. As a working assistant to a physical therapist, she had very little time to prepare for the pageant.

The Jinder's 18th Annual Miss India America Pageant was held at the Hilton Hotel, Long Beach, California, on 7 August 2009. Pinto was declared a winner, and crowned Miss India America 2009, among the 14 contestants in the Miss category. She also won the JIN Model Management's Miss Photogenic award at the event.

References

External links
 Mangalorean beauty Diana Pinto Crowned Ms. India America 2009! from Mangalorean.Com
Gloss and Glitter at Beauty Pageant from India Journal

Mangaloreans
Living people
Indian beauty pageant winners
Miss Asia USA delegates
Year of birth missing (living people)
Female models from Maharashtra